Acciaio may refer to:
steel in the Italian language
Steel (1933 film)
Steel (2012 film)

Italian submarine Acciaio